John Charles "Jack" Major  (born February 20, 1931) is a Canadian jurist and was a puisne justice on the Supreme Court of Canada from 1992 to 2005.

Early life and education
Born in Mattawa, Ontario, Major received a Bachelor of Commerce degree from Loyola College in 1953 and a Bachelor of Laws degree from the University of Toronto Faculty of Law in 1957.

Career
He practised law as a partner in the Calgary office of Bennett Jones LLP for 34 years. He was appointed a Queen's Counsel in 1972.  From 1975 to 1985, he was the Senior Counsel for the City of Calgary Police Service. He was appointed to the Court of Appeal of Alberta on July 11, 1991.

Supreme Court
On November 13, 1992, he was appointed to the Supreme Court of Canada by Prime Minister Brian Mulroney. During much of his time of the Court, he was a comparatively low-key judge. He was known for his belief in providing deference to government and for his particularly succinct writing style. Major stepped down from the court on December 25, 2005, approximately two months before the mandatory retirement date of his 75th birthday.

Administrator of Canada

On September 27, 2005 Major served as Administrator of Canada due to the absence of Chief Justice Beverley McLachlin during the transition from Adrienne Clarkson to Michaëlle Jean.

Post-court
On January 5, 2006, he rejoined the Calgary office of Bennett Jones LLP, the firm with which he practised before his judicial career. On March 8, 2006, he was appointed by Prime Minister Stephen Harper to lead a public inquiry into the Air India Flight 182 bombing and the resulting trials. He was made a Companion of the Order of Canada in the Canada Day 2008 Honours.

See also
 Reasons of the Supreme Court of Canada by Justice Major

References

External links
 

1931 births
Canadian King's Counsel
Lawyers in Alberta
Judges in Alberta
Companions of the Order of Canada
Justices of the Supreme Court of Canada
University of Toronto Faculty of Law alumni
Air India Flight 182
People from Mattawa, Ontario
Living people
Loyola College (Montreal) alumni